Dendrodrilus is a genus of annelids belonging to the family Lumbricidae.

Species:
 Dendrodrilus rubidus (Savigny, 1826)

References

Lumbricidae
Annelid genera